Eucryphia cordifolia, the ulmo, is a species of tree in the family Cunoniaceae. It is found in Chile and Argentina. It is threatened by logging and habitat loss. The natural habitat is along the Andes Range from 38 to 43°S, and up to 700 meters (2300 ft) above sea level. It blooms in February and March, depending on latitude and altitude. The fruit is a capsule about 1.5 cm (0.6 in) length.

Cultivation and uses 
Its flowers contain a highly appreciated aromatic nectar, harvested by introduced European bees and commercialized as ulmo honey (miel de Ulmo).
The wood is light brown to brown, heavy, moderately firm, rather hard and quite resistant to decay. It is used locally for construction and very extensively as firewood.

It grows well on the western coast of Scotland, UK, where there are several notable specimens, including possibly the most northerly cultivated example at Inverewe Garden. It dislikes cold winters. It can also be found in southern England and the island of Ireland. It has been planted in the North Pacific Coast of the United States.

Chemical composition 
Eucryphin, a chromone rhamnoside, can be isolated from the bark of E. cordifolia.

References

External links 

cordifolia
Flora of the Andes
Flora of Argentina
Flora of Chile
Trees of mild maritime climate
Trees of Chile
Flora of the Valdivian temperate rainforest
Near threatened flora of South America
Taxonomy articles created by Polbot
Taxa named by Antonio José Cavanilles